Combs Branch is a stream in Bollinger and Madison counties in the U.S. state of Missouri. It is a tributary of the Castor River

Combs Branch has the name of Silas Comb, a pioneer citizen.

See also
List of rivers of Missouri

References

Rivers of Bollinger County, Missouri
Rivers of Madison County, Missouri
Rivers of Missouri